Anthony Chan Yau (born 1 October 1952) is a Hong Kong actor and the drummer for the band Wynners.

Filmography

Enter the Fat Dragon (2019)
House of the Rising Sons (2018)
The Yuppie Fantasia 3 (2017)
Rigor Mortis (2013)
Paris Holiday (2015)
Mr Vampire (1985)
Mr Vampire IV (1988)

References

External links

Living people
1952 births
20th-century Hong Kong male actors
21st-century Hong Kong male actors
Hong Kong drummers
Hong Kong film directors
Hong Kong male film actors
Cantonese people